This article lists compositions written for the viola.  The list includes works in which the viola is a featured instrument: viola solo, viola and piano, viola and orchestra, ensemble of violas, etc.  Catalogue number, date of composition and publisher (for copyrighted works) are also included.  Ordering is by composer surname.

This pages lists composers whose surname falls into the C to E alphabetic range.  For others, see respective pages:
 List of compositions for viola: A to B
 List of compositions for viola: F to H
 List of compositions for viola: I to K
 List of compositions for viola: L to N
 List of compositions for viola: O to R
 List of compositions for viola: S
 List of compositions for viola: T to Z

C
 John Cage (1912–1992)
     26'1.1499" for viola solo (1959); Henmar Press
     59½ Seconds for viola solo (1953); Henmar Press
     Dream for viola solo and ensemble of 4 violas (1948); Edition Peters
 Louis Calabro (1926–1991)
     Double Concerto for viola, cello and orchestra (1986)
     Ten Short Pieces (in First Position) for violin and viola; Elkan-Vogel; Theodore Presser Company
     Variations for viola solo (1990)
 Leonhard von Call (1767?–1815)
     Serenade in G major for flute, viola and guitar, Op. 14
     Serenade in D major for flute, viola and guitar, Op. 30
     Serenade in F major for flute, viola and guitar, Op. 47
     Serenade in A minor for flute, viola and guitar, Op. 50
     Serenade in C major for flute, viola and guitar, Op. 66
     Serenade in A major for flute, viola and guitar, Op. 75
     Serenade in C major for flute, viola and guitar, Op. 80
     Serenade in A major for flute, viola and guitar, Op. 82
     Serenade in G major for flute, viola and guitar, Op. 142
 Ann Callaway (b. 1949)
     Chorale for viola solo (1993); J.B. Elkus Music; Subito Music
 Sergio Calligaris (b. 1941)
     Sonata for viola and piano, Op. 39 (1997–1998); Carisch
 Ronald Caltabiano (b. 1959)
     Character Sketch for viola solo (2002); Theodore Presser Company
     Lyric Duo for viola and harp (1979); Theodore Presser Company
 Giuseppe Cambini (1746–1825)
     Concerto in D major for viola and orchestra
     6 Duos for flute and viola, Op. 4 (c.1775)
     12 Duos concertants for 2 violas (1788); Gems Music Publications
     6 Trios for flute, violin and viola, Op. 26
 Bartolomeo Campagnoli (1751–1827)
     41 Caprices for viola solo, Op. 22 (c.1815)
     12 Duets for 2 violas
     6 Fugues for viola solo, Op. 10; arranged from violin solo by Giuseppe Alessandri
     L'illusion de la viole d'amour: Sonate notturne for violin and viola, Op. 16 (1811)
     6 Solos (Sonatas) for violin and cello or viola, Op. 6
 Conrado del Campo (1878–1953)
     Pequeña pieza for viola and piano, Op. 6 (1906); Editorial de Música Española Contemporanea
     Poema de los loores de María, Symphonic Poem for solo viola and orchestra (1944)
     Romanza in F major for viola and piano, Op. 5 (1901); Editorial de Música Española Contemporanea
     Suite for viola and small orchestra (1940)
 Frank Campo (b. 1927)
     Canto Notturno for viola and percussion, Op. 69 (1984); Mitchell Peters
     Elegy for viola and orchestra, Op. 112 (2002); Dario Music
     Paesaggio for clarinet, viola and piano, Op. 95 (1994); Dario Music
 Nicola Campogrande (b. 1969)
     Istruzioni per il cielo for clarinet, viola and piano (2010)
     Ludwig van Gotlibovich for viola solo (2011)
 Christian Cannabich (1731–1798)
     6 Duettos for violin and viola (1779)
 Pierre Capdevielle (1906–1969)
     Sonata for viola and piano
     Sonatina pastorale for flute and viola (1964); Éditions Françaises de Musique
 Lucien Capet (1873–1928)
     Aria in A minor for violin, viola and piano, Op. 5 (1908)
 Mauro Cardi (b. 1955)
     Al di sopra del lago è il vento for viola and piano (1993); Edizioni Nuova Fonit Cetra, Ricordi
     La Follia for viola (and viola d'amore) and string orchestra (2017)
     Lettura di un'onda for viola and guitar (1991); Edizioni Ricordi
 Robert Carl (b. 1954)
     Excavating the Perfect Farewell for viola and piano (2003); American Composers Alliance
     A Sampler of the Senses for viola, cello and piano (1994); American Composers Alliance
 David Carlson (b. 1952)
     True Divided Light for viola and piano (2005); Carl Fischer; United Music Publishers
 Mark Carlson (b. 1952)
     On the Coming of War, Sonata for viola and piano (2003); Pacific Serenades
 Edwin Carr (1926–2003)
     Two Dances for viola and piano (1963); Australian Music Centre
 Paul Carr (b. 1961)
     Viola Air for viola and string orchestra (2007); Goodmusic
 Richard Carrick (b. 1971)
     Shadow Flow for viola solo (2007); Schott Music; Project Schott New York
     Shadow Fragments for viola solo (2006)
 Julián Carrillo (1875–1965)
     Concurso for viola and piano (1908)
     Cuatro casi sonatas para viola sola (Almost Four Sonatas) for viola solo (1961)
     Tres sonatas para viola en cuartos de tono (Three Sonatas in Quarter Tones) for viola solo (1930)
Adam Carse (1878–1958)
     Bourree in C for 2 violins and viola
     A Breezy Story in G major for viola and piano (published 1932); Stainer & Bell
     Calm Reflection in G major for viola and piano (published 1932); Stainer & Bell
     Gently Swaying for viola and piano
     Heartache in A minor for viola and piano (published 1932); Stainer & Bell
     Thoughtfulness in C major for viola and piano (published 1932); Augener
 Elliott Carter (1908–2012)
     Au Quai for bassoon and viola (2002); Boosey & Hawkes
     Elegy for viola and piano (1943, revised 1961); Peer Music
     Figment IV for viola solo (2007); Boosey & Hawkes
     Pastoral for viola and piano (1945); Merion Music
 Ferdinando Carulli (1770–1841)
     2 Duetti for viola and guitar, Op. 137
 Benet Casablancas (b. 1956)
     Peça... De música d'un ballet for viola solo (1980); Clivis Publicacions
     Poema for viola (or clarinet) and piano (1996); La Mà de Guido
 Henri Casadesus (1879–1947)
     Concerto in B minor "in the Style of George Frideric Handel" for viola and orchestra (published 1924)
     Concerto in C minor "in the Style of Johann Christian Bach" for viola and orchestra (published 1947)
 Robert Casadesus (1899–1972)
     Sonata for viola and piano, Op. 12 (1928); International Music Company
 Philip Cashian (b. 1963)
     The Dark Horsemen and Other Tales for soprano and viola (1996); British Music Information Centre
     The Devil's Box for clarinet, viola and piano (1999); British Music Information Centre
      Jarl for viola solo (2002); British Music Information Centre
 John Casken (b. 1949)
     Farness for soprano, solo viola and chamber orchestra (2006); Schott Music
 Joseph Castaldo (1927–2000)
     Chamber Sonata for violin and viola; manuscript
     Concerto for viola and orchestra (1988–1989)
        I. Lament
        II. Canticle-Celebration
 Mario Castelnuovo-Tedesco (1895–1968)
     Sonata in C minor for viola and cello, Op. 144 (1950); Affiliated Musicians
     Sonata for violin and viola, Op. 127 (1945); Theodore Presser Company
     Suite 508: Greeting Cards for viola and piano, Op. 170 No. 21 (1960)
 Jacques Castérède (1926–2014) 
     Sonata for viola and piano (1968); Éditions Choudens
     Les Heures Calmes, 3 Pieces for 1, 2 and 3 violas (1987); Éditions JM Fuzeau
 Eugenio Cavallini (1806–1881)
     Divertimento in G major for viola solo and string quartet (or string orchestra) (1829)
     Guida per lo studio della viola (Viola Method), Book II: 24 Studi in tuoni minori (24 Studies in Minor Keys) for viola solo (c.1845)
     Guida per lo studio della viola (Viola Method), Book III: Concert Pieces for viola and piano (c.1845)
     Fantasia
     Souvenir
     Fantasia originale (a.k.a. Fantasia) for viola and piano (or 2 violas, 2 cellos and double bass)
     Tema con Variazioni
     Polacca
     Fantasia originale
     Tema Variato (Theme and Variations) in E major
     Adagio Variato dell'Opera Poliuto
     Serenata
     Riminiscenze di Santa Cristina, Fantasy for solo viola, 2 violas, 2 cellos and double bass (published c.1860)
 Jeremy Cavaterra (b. 1971)
     Sonata for violin and viola (2007)
     Trio for flute, viola and harp (2012)
 Norman Cazden (1914–1980)
     Chamber Sonata No. 2 for viola solo, Op. 17 No. 2 (1938)
     Chamber Sonata No. 3 for clarinet and viola, Op. 17 No. 3 (1938)
     Concerto for viola and orchestra, Op. 103a (1972); MCA; Belwin Mills
     The Lass of Glenshee from Three Ballads from the Catskills for viola and chamber orchestra, Op. 52 (1956); Composers Facsimile Edition; MCA; Belwin Mills
     Sonata for viola and piano, Op. 104a (1974); Andrews Music House, Bangor
     Three Recitations for cello (or viola) and piano, Op. 24 (1941); Andrews Music House, Bangor; Composers Facsimile Edition
 Monic Cecconi-Botella (b. 1936)
     Cérémonie for viola and piano; Collection Panorama: Œuvres Contemporaines, Volume 3; Éditions Gérard Billaudot
 Alexandre Eugène Cellier (1883–1968)
     Sonate en sol bémol majeur (Sonata in G Major) for viola and piano (1923); Éditions M. Senart
 Friedrich Cerha (1926–2023)
     Alles Licht for tenor and viola (1988–1989); Doblinger
     Concerto for viola and orchestra (1993); Universal Edition
     Sonata for viola and guitar (or lute) (1951); Doblinger
     Sonata for viola and piano (1951); Doblinger
 Jordi Cervelló (1935–2022)
     Cant nocturn for viola and orchestra (1991); Catalana d'Edicions Musicals
     Entre deux for viola and cello (2011); Editorial de Música Boileau
     Íscor for violin and viola (1999); Editorial de Música Boileau
     Llegenda for viola solo (2000); Editorial de Música Boileau
     Souvenir for viola solo (2000); Editorial de Música Boileau
     Sonata per a viola (Sonata for Viola) (2000); Editorial de música española contemporanea
     Tertis Sonata for viola and piano (2012); Editorial de Música Boileau
     Tre pensieri for viola and piano (2009); Editorial de Música Boileau
 Jacques Chailley (1910–1999)
     Improvisation à deux for violin and viola (1949); Éditions Alphonse Leduc
     Prélude et allegro for viola and cello (1977); Éditions Alphonse Leduc
     Premiers concerts: 12 morceaux faciles d'après les "Exercices divertissants" de Marie-Thérèse Chailley (First Concerts: 12 Easy Pieces after "Exercices Divertissants" by Marie-Thérèse Chailley) for violin (or viola) and piano (1974); Éditions Alphonse Leduc
     Sonata for viola and piano (1939–1941); Éditions Alphonse Leduc
 Henri Challan (1910–1977)
     Diptyque for viola and piano (1961); Éditions Alphonse Leduc
 Ka Nin Chan (b. 1949)
     The Charmer for viola solo and 2 percussion (1994)
     Gibora, Concerto for viola and orchestra (1997)
     Musical Offering for 2 violas (1994)
     Soulmate for solo viola (2001); Canadian Music Centre
 Chan Wing-wah (b. 1954)
     Scherzo for viola and piano (1978)
     Summer Day (夏日) for oboe, viola and cello (2000)
 Agustí Charles (b. 1960)
     Cielo de Ceniza for mezzo-soprano, viola and chamber ensemble (1995); words by Federico García Lorca
     Laments for alto, viola and chamber ensemble (1991); words by Federico García Lorca
     Lointain intérieur, Double Concerto for violin and viola with 6 female voices and orchestra (1991–1992)
 Jacques Charpentier (1933–2017)
     Chant bref for viola and piano; Collection Panorama: Œuvres Contemporaines, Volume 3 (1989); Éditions Gérard Billaudot
     Couleurs pour une sonate imaginaire (Colors for an Imaginary Sonata) for viola and piano (1991); Éditions Alphonse Leduc; United Music Publishers
 Stephen Chatman (b. 1950)
     Northern Drones for viola and off-stage percussion (1976); Canadian Music Centre
     Varley Suite for viola solo (2005); Highgate Press; ECS Publishing; Canadian Music Centre
 Ernest Chausson (1855–1899)
     Pièce for viola and piano, Op. 39 (1897); Éditions Salabert
 Carlos Chávez (1899–1978)
     Madrigal for viola and piano (1921); Carlanita Music Company; G. Schirmer
     Soli III for bassoon, trumpet, viola, timpani and orchestra (1965); Mills Music
 Charles Chaynes (1925–2016)
     Alternances for viola and piano (1966); Alphonse Leduc
 Shih-Hui Chen (b. 1962)
     Remembrance (思想起中提琴協奏曲 Shu Shon Key) for viola and chamber orchestra or chamber ensemble (2006); Trigon Music Press
 Chen Yi (b. 1953)
     Happy Tune (欢乐歌) for violin and viola (2018); Theodore Presser
     Memory (思念) for viola solo (2010); original for violin solo; Theodore Presser
     Xian Shi (弦诗, "String Poem"), Tone Poem for viola and orchestra (1983); Theodore Presser Company
 Brian Cherney (b. 1942)
     Beyond the Seventh Palace for viola and percussion (1982); Canadian Music Centre
     Chamber Concerto for viola and 10 players (1975); Canadian Music Centre
     In Stillness Ascending for viola and piano (1986); McGill; Canadian Music Centre
     Music for a Summer Wedding for flute, viola and harp (2000–2002); Canadian Music Centre
     Seven Miniatures in the Form of a Mobile for viola solo (1978); Canadian Music Centre
     Shekhinah for viola solo (1988); Doberman-Yppan
     Trois petites pièces désséchées... En forme de sandwich for viola and piano (1979); Brian Cherney
 Luciano Chessa (b. 1971)
     Cinabro for viola and piano (2006)
 Camille Chevillard (1859–1923)
     Introduction et marche for viola and piano, Op. 22 (published 1905); Costallat & Cie.
     Quatre pièces (4 Pieces) for viola and piano, Op. 4 (1887); Enoch & Compagnie
 Hideki Chihara (b. 1957)
     Saimon (祭文; Eulogy) for viola and piano
 Paul Chihara (b. 1938)
     Concerto "JFK: Requiescat in pace" for viola and orchestra (1963)
     Duo Concertante for violin and viola (1989); Henmar Press; C.F. Peters
     Redwood for viola and percussion (1968); Protone Music; C.F. Peters
     Sonata "De Profundis" for viola and piano (1994, 2009); C.F. Peters
     Songs of Love and Loss for solo viola and choir (2001); C.F. Peters
     Tree Music for 3 violas and 3 trombones (1966)
     When Soft Voices Die, Concerto for viola and orchestra (2008); C.F. Peters
 Barney Childs (1926–2000)
     The Day Sequence: 1 for viola and piano (1969); American Composers Alliance
     Interbalances II for viola and another instrument (1961); American Composers Alliance
     Music for One Player (1967); American Composers Alliance
     Sonata for solo viola (1956); American Composers Alliance
 Erik Chisholm (1904–1965)
     Sonata for viola solo; Scottish Music Centre
 Geghuni Chitchyan (b. 1929)
     Sonata for viola and piano (1986); Sovetsky Kompozitor
 Gian Paolo Chiti (b. 1939)
     Rime for medium voice, viola and piano (1998)
     Sur le bois oubliés for viola solo, Op. 100 (1995); Musik Fabrik France
     Viorgan for viola and organ (2007); Musik Fabrik France
 Osvald Chlubna (1893–1971)
     Fantasie in C minor for viola and orchestra, Op. 44 (1936); Český Hudební Fond
     Fantasie for violin and viola, Op. 71 (1949)
     Invence (Invention) for viola solo (1962); Panton
     Sonatina for viola and piano, Op. 119; Český Hudební Fond
 Fabio Cifariello Ciardi (b. 1960)
     Pa(e/s)saggi for viola, live electronics and multi-track tape (2000)
 Maia Ciobanu (b. 1952)
     Decor IV for clarinet and viola (2003)
     NR.273,16: Intersecţii (Crossroads) for saxophone, viola and live electronics (2007)
 Seán Clancy (b. 1984)
     Jórvík, Lines Linking Disparate Sites, Lines of Information for violin and viola (2008)
     Ursatz, Music by Numbers II for viola solo (2010); Contemporary Music Centre Ireland
 F. R. C. Clarke (1931–2009)
     My Beloved Spake, Song for alto, viola and piano (1985); Canadian Music Centre
     Reverie and Rondo for clarinet, viola and piano (1993); Canadian Music Centre
     Sonata for viola and piano (1988); Canadian Music Centre
     Suite for violin and viola (1982, 1987); original version for flute and clarinet; Canadian Music Centre
 James Clarke (b. 1957)
     Isolation for violin or viola solo (1997)
 Nigel Clarke (b. 1960)
     Flashpoint for viola solo, Op. 8 (1990, revised 2009); Maecenas Music; Edition Peters
     Rain Dance for viola solo, Op. 7 (1990, revised 2009); Edition Peters
 Rebecca Clarke (1886–1979)
     Dumka, Duo Concertante for violin, viola and piano (1940–1941); Oxford University Press
     I'll Bid My Heart Be Still (Old Scotch Border Melody) for viola and piano (1944); Oxford University Press
     Lullaby for viola and piano (1909); Oxford University Press
     Lullaby (An Arrangement of an Ancient Irish Tune) for viola and piano (1913); Oxford University Press
     Morpheus for viola and piano (1917–1918); Oxford University Press
     Passacaglia on an Old English Tune for viola and piano (1941?); Oxford University Press
     Prelude, Allegro and Pastorale for clarinet and viola (1941); Oxford University Press
     Sonata for viola and piano (1919); Chester Music
     Two Pieces (Lullaby and Grotesque) for viola and cello (1916?); Oxford University Press
 Rhona Clarke (b. 1958)
     The Waterford Suite: Jealous Pursuit for viola and piano (1997); Contemporary Music Centre Ireland
 Ann Cleare (b. 1983)
     Dysmorphia for viola and cello (2008); Contemporary Music Centre Ireland
     IRK for viola and optional live electronics (2006); also for violin; Contemporary Music Centre Ireland
 Andrea Clearfield (b. 1960)
     …and low to the lake falls home for flute, viola and harp (2009); Angelfire Press
     Convergence for viola and piano (2008); Angelfire Press
 Aldo Clementi (1925–2011)
     Variazioni (Variations) for viola solo (1979); Edizioni Suvini Zerboni
     Capriccio for viola and 24 instruments (1979–1980); Edizioni Suvini Zerboni
 Eric Coates (1886–1957) 
     Ballad in G major for viola and piano, Op. 13 (1906); published in A Second Lionel Tertis Album; Josef Weinberger
     First Meeting, Souvenir for viola and piano (1941); Chappell Music; Josef Weinberger (A Lionel Tertis Album)
 Gloria Coates (b. 1938)
     In the Mt. Tremper Zen Monastery for percussion, harp and viola (1992)
     Lichtsplitter for flute, viola and harp (1988); also a version for flute, viola, harp and percussion
     Phantasie über "Wie schön leuchtet der Morgenstern" (Fantasy on "May the Morningstar Rise" ["How Lovely Shines the Morningstar"]) for amplified viola and organ (1974)
 Bob Cobert (1924–2020)
     Concert Piece for viola and small orchestra (1992)
     Contrasts for viola and cello (2001)
     Music for Only One Lonely Viola for viola solo (2003); American Viola Society Publications
     Three Moods for Two Violas for 2 violas (2001); American Viola Society Publications
 Robert Cogan (1930–2021)
     Events Dancing, Open-ended Folio for viola and piano (1989); Sonic Design
     Sonata for viola and piano (1953); Independent Music Publishers
 Gerald Cohen (b. 1960)
     Aria and Scherzo for violin and viola (1994); Oxford University Press
     Trio for viola, cello and piano (1999); Oxford University Press
     Yedid nefesh, Trio for clarinet, viola and piano (2007)
 James Cohn (1928–2021)
     Duo in C for violin and viola (1952)
     Sonata for viola and piano (1987)
 Reine Colaço Osorio-Swaab (1881–1971)
     Sonata No. 3 for viola and piano (1952); Donemus
     Tsaddiék, Intermezzo for viola and piano (1953); Donemus
 Jonathan Cole (b. 1970)
     Brood for clarinet and viola (2002); G. Ricordi London
     Simulacrum for viola solo (2008)
 Dan Coleman (b. 1972)
     Dezembrum for viola and cello (1992)
     Poem at Night for viola and piano (1992)
     Summer for viola and piano (2003)
 Paul Coletti (b. 1959)
     "D" luscious for viola solo (2008, revised 2016)
     Fantasia for viola solo (2015)
     Journey for 2 violas (2006)
     3 Pieces for viola and piano (1993–2002); Oxford University Press
     Requiem for viola solo (2016)
     Voyage for viola solo (2003, revised 2016)
 Michael Colgrass (1932–2019)
     Chaconne for viola and orchestra (1984); Carl Fischer
     New People, 7 Songs for mezzo-soprano, viola and piano (1969); MCA Music; Carl Fischer
     Strangers: Irreconcilable Variations for clarinet, viola and piano (1986); Carl Fischer
     Variations for Four Drums and Viola (1957); Music for Percussion
 Johannes Colizzi (c.1742–1808)
     3 Sonatas for viola and harpsichord or piano, Op. 4 (1778)
 Henri Collet (1885–1951)
     Rapsodie Castillane for viola and orchestra, Op. 73 No. 2 (1923); Éditions Maurice Senart
 Anthony Collins (1893–1963)
     Romney Marsh for viola and orchestra (1944); Novello & Co.
 Guillaume Connesson (b. 1970)
     Constellation de la Couronne australe (Constellation Corona Australis) for viola and orchestra (or piano) (2008); Éditions Gérard Billaudot
     Constellation de la Couronne boréale (Constellation Corona Borealis) for viola and piano (2005); Éditions Gérard Billaudot; United Music Publishers
     Constellations, Concerto for viola and orchestra (2009); Éditions Gérard Billaudot
 Justin Connolly  (1933–2020)
     Anima for viola and orchestra, Op. 27 (1974); Novello & Co.
     Celebratio super Ter in lyris Leo for 3 violas and accordion, Op. 29/II (1994–1995); Novello & Co.
     Celebratio per viola sola, Op. 29/IV (2005); Novello & Co.
     Poems of Wallace Stevens IV for mezzo-soprano, viola and piano, Op. 38 (1992); Novello & Co.
     Triad I for trumpet, viola and piano, Op. 2 (1964); Novello & Co.
     Triad III for oboe, viola and cello, Op. 8 (1966); Novello & Co.
     Triad VI for viola, piano and tape, Op. 21 (1974); lost
 Marius Constant (1925–2004)
     Recitativo for viola solo (1983); Éditions Salabert
 Paul Constantinescu (1909–1963)
     Sonata bizantină for viola or cello solo (1943); Editura Muzicală, Bucharest
 Dinos Constantinides (1929–2021)
     At the Village for oboe (or clarinet or viola) and piano (1980); Magni Publications
     Fantasia for viola solo (1982); Conners Publications
     Fantasia for Stelios and Yiannis for violin and viola (2009); Magni Publications
     Four Interludes for viola solo (1991); Conners Publications
     Grecian Variations for viola and string orchestra (1987) or piano (1991); Magni Publications
     Greek Dance, Trio for flute, viola and guitar (or for 2 violins and viola) (1970); Cimarron Music and Reproductions (Whaling Music Publishers)
     Reflections II for voice and viola (1982); words by Elizabeth Barrett Browning; Magni Publications
     Sonata for viola and piano (1971); Seesaw Music Corporation
 Sylvia Constantinidis  (b. 1962)
     Sunrise for viola and piano, Op. 22 (2002)
 Barry Conyngham (b. 1944)
     Streams for flute, viola and harp (1988); Australian Music Centre
     Viola for viola solo (1981); Universal Edition; Australian Music Centre
     Waterways for viola and orchestra (1990); Universal Edition; Australian Music Centre
 Arnold Cooke (1906–2005)
     Duo for violin and viola (1935); Anglo-American Music Publishers
     Little Suite for flute and viola (1957); Anglo-American Music Publishers
     Sonata in F major for viola and piano (1936–1937); Oxford University Press; Anglo-American Music Publishers
 Carlton Cooley (1898–1981)
     Aria and Dance for viola and orchestra (1965?)
     Concertino for viola and orchestra (1937); Dimit Edition; Henri Elkan Music Publishers
     Etude Suite for viola solo (1962); Henri Elkan Music Publishers
     Scale Studies for Viola (1964); Henri Elkan Music Publishers
     A Song and Dance for viola and piano (1927); Éditions Maurice Senart
 Carson Cooman (b. 1982)
     Aquarius Chaconnes (Birthday Music for Marisa) for viola and organ, Op. 471 (2002); Parsonage Press; Subito Music Corporation
     Cavatina for viola and piano, Op. 776 (2008); Musik Fabrik
     2 Lullabies for viola and trombone (or cello), Op. 654 (2005); Musik Fabrik
     Planctus for viola solo, Op. 665 (2005); Musik Fabrik
     Showings of Divine Love, Dramatic Sacred Tableaux for viola and organ, Op. 459 (2002); Parsonage Press; Subito Music Corporation
 Paul Cooper (1926–1996)
     Canons d'Amour for violin and viola (1981); G. Schirmer
     Canti for viola and piano (1981); G. Schirmer
     Descants for viola and orchestra (1975); G. Schirmer
     Double Concerto for violin, viola and orchestra (1985); G. Schirmer
     Homage for flute, trumpet, viola and orchestra (1976); G. Schirmer
     A Shenandoah for Charles Ives's Birthday for flute, trumpet, viola and orchestra (1974); G. Schirmer
     Symphony No. 4 "Landscape" for flute, trumpet, viola and orchestra (1973); G. Schirmer
     Variants II for viola and piano (1972); Chester Music; G. Schirmer
     Verses for violin and viola (1991); G. Schirmer
 Aaron Copland (1900–1990)
     Alone for voice, viola and piano (1921)
     Elegies for violin and viola (1932)
 Claude Coppens (b. 1936)
     Une Semaine de Bonté for viola solo (1985); CeBeDeM
 Giampaolo Coral (1944–2011)
     Huldigung (Homage) for viola and cello (1983); Edizioni Curci
 Frank Corcoran (b. 1944) 
     Quasi Variations on 'A Mháirín de Bharra'  for viola solo (2004); Contemporary Music Centre Ireland
 Roque Cordero (1917–2008)
     Concertino for viola and string orchestra (1968)
     Tres Mensajes Breves (3 Brief Messages) for viola and piano (1970); Peer Music Classical
 Azio Corghi (1937–2022)
     Actus II for viola and piano (1976); Edizioni Suvini Zerboni
     Tang'jok(her) for viola solo (2008); G. Ricordi Milan
 John Corigliano (b. 1938)
     Fancy on a Bach Air for viola solo (1996); G. Schirmer
 Michel Corrette (1707–1795)
     Sonata in B major for viola and basso continuo (1773)
 Eleanor Cory (b. 1943)
     Interviews for viola and piano (1996); American Composers Alliance
 Mónica Cosachov (b. 1946)
     Juegos for viola and piano (1980)
     Ganas de tango for viola and piano (1982)
 Jean Coulthard (1908–2000)
     The Bird of Dawning Singeth All Night Long for flute, viola and guitar (1983); Canadian Music Centre
     Meditation and Three Dances for viola and string orchestra (1988); Canadian Music Centre
     Music for Midsummer, Trios for soprano, viola and piano (1970); Canadian Music Centre
     Sonata Rhapsody for viola and piano (1962); Canadian Music Centre
     Songs of a Dreamer for soprano and viola (1982); Canadian Music Centre
     Symphonic Ode for viola and orchestra (1977); Canadian Music Centre
     When Music Sounds for viola and piano (1986); Canadian Music Centre
 François Couperin (1668–1733)
     La Bandoline from Pièces de clavecin, 1er livre (published 1713); transcription for viola and piano by Tibor Serly (1947)
 Henry Cowell (1897–1965)
     Hymn and Fuguing Tune No. 7 for viola and piano, HC 710 (1946); Peermusic Classical
     Variations on Thirds for 2 violas and string orchestra, HC 882 (1960); Edition Peters
     Viola Song for viola and piano (1918–1919)
 Cindy Cox (b. 1961)
     Turner for viola and piano (2008); World a Tuning Fork Press
 Jean Cras (1879–1932)
     L'âme (The Soul), Second Sonata for viola and piano (1900)
 John Craton (b. 1953)
     Mongolian Folk Songs for viola and chamber orchestra (2003); Wolfhead Music
     Six Easy Pieces for viola (in first position) and piano (2013); Wolfhead Music
 Paul Creston (1906–1985)
     Suite for viola and piano, Op. 13 (1938); Shawnee Press
     Homage for viola and string orchestra, Op. 41 (1947); Shawnee Press
     Suite for flute, viola and piano, Op. 56 (1953); Shawnee Press
 Gordon Crosse (1937–2021)
     Concerto for viola and string orchestra with horn (2009)
 Stephen Crowe (b. 1979)
     Shirtless Buff Swan, Viola Concerto (2014)
     Toffee Cock for viola solo (2013)
 Adrian Cruft (1921–1987)
     Impromptu in B major for viola (or clarinet) and piano, Op. 22 (published 1957); Joseph Williams; Chappell Music; Joad Press
     Romance for viola and piano, Op. 13 (published 1957); Joseph Williams; Joad Press
 George Crumb (1929–2022)
     Sonata for viola and piano (1953)
 Zulema de la Cruz (b. 1958)
     Danzas Galegas (Galician Dances) for viola solo (2003); Editorial Alpuerto
 Robert Cuckson (b. 1942)
     Adagio for viola and piano (1961); Australian Music Centre
     Ayre for viola
     Quetzalcoatl for flute and viola (1970); Australian Music Centre
 Dimitrie Cuclin (1885–1978)
     Etude-Sonata for 2 violas (1960); Uniunea Bucharest
 Edric Cundell (1893–1961)
     Rhapsody for viola (or cello) and piano (c.1920); W. Paxton & Co.
 Douglas J. Cuomo (b. 1958)
     A Far Playground for viola and piano (2009); Schott Helicon Music; Project Schott New York
 Henrique de Curitiba (1934–2008)
     Cornell Impressions, 4 Short Pieces for viola and piano (1979)
 Sebastian Currier (b. 1959)
     Pulse for viola and guitar (2002)
     Uncertainties for viola and piano (1993); C. Fischer
 Joe Cutler (b. 1968)
     Concerto for viola and string orchestra (2008)
     Five Mobiles after Alexander Calder for soprano saxophone (or clarinet), viola and piano (2000); British Music Information Centre
     Gaïa for viola solo (1993); British Music Information Centre
     Music for Sunflowers for viola and string orchestra (2009)
 Benjamin Cutter (1857–1910)
     Eine Liebes-Novelle (A Love Story), 5 Bagatelles for viola and piano, Op. 20 (1894); Arthur P. Schmidt, Boston; American Viola Society Publications

D
 Jean Daetwyler (1907–1994)
     Concerto for viola and orchestra (1979)
 Jörgen Dafgård (b. 1964)
     For the Sleeping: Dream Sonata for viola and tape (1997–1998)
     Frames and Flow, 6 Duets for violin, viola and cello (1988–2000); Nos. 1 and 3 for viola and cello; Nos. 2 and 5 for violin and viola; STIM; Swedish Music Information Centre
 Roland Dahinden (b. 1962)
     broken lines for viola and electronics (2004)
     the leaf for female voice, viola and electronics (2005)
     lichtung kiel for viola and live electronics (1999)
 Ingolf Dahl (1912–1970)
     Divertimento for viola and piano (1948); Theodore Presser Company
 Marc-André Dalbavie (b. 1961)
     Diadèmes for viola solo, instrumental ensemble and electronic ensemble (1986); Éditions Jobert
     Petit interlude for viola and piano (1992); Éditions Gérard Billaudot
 Martin Dalby (1942–2018)
     Scotch Rhapsody for viola and piano (1983); Novello & Co.
     Concerto for viola and orchestra (1974); Novello & Co.
 Benjamin Dale (1885–1943)
     Come Away, Death in D major for low voice, viola and piano; No. 2 from Two Songs from Shakespeare, Op. 9 (1919); words from William Shakespeare's Twelfth Night
     English Dance for viola and piano (1916); arranged for viola and piano by York Bowen; Comus Edition
     Introduction and Andante for 6 violas, Op. 5 (1911, revised 1913); Corda Music Publications
     Phantasy in D minor for viola and piano, Op. 4 (1909); Edition Schott
     Suite in D major for viola and piano, Op. 2 (1906); Novello & Co.
       Maestoso – Allegretto espressivo
       Romance (also for viola and orchestra)
       Allegro (also for viola and orchestra)
 Fridolin Dallinger (1933–2020)
     Sonata for viola and piano (1965); Verlag Doblinger
 Jean-Michel Damase (1928–2013)
     Aria for cello (or viola) and piano, Op. 7 (1949); Éditions Salabert; United Music Publishers
     Concerto for viola, harp and string orchestra (1990); Éditions Henry Lemoine
     Épigraphe for viola and piano (1991); Éditions Gérard Billaudot; United Music Publishers
     Hallucinations for viola and harp; Harposphère
     Intermède for viola and piano (1990); Editions Combre; United Music Publishers
     Ostinato for viola and piano (1991); Éditions Gérard Billaudot; United Music Publishers
     Trio for flute, viola and harp (1947); Éditions Henry Lemoine
 Leopold Damrosch (1832–1885)
     Liebesgesang (Love Song), Notturno for viola and piano (published 1888); transcription by Hermann Ritter
 Jules Danbé (1840–1905)
     Villanelle in C minor for viola and piano, Op. 14b (1874, 1877); original for violin and piano
 Richard Danielpour (b. 1956)
     Come Up from the Fields Father for baritone, viola and piano (2008); words by Walt Whitman; Lean Kat Music
 Franz Danzi (1763–1826)
     3 Duos for viola and cello (Book 1)
     3 Duos for viola and cello (Book 2), Op. 9
 Jean-Luc Darbellay (b. 1946)
     À Deux (For Two) for horn or bassethorn and viola (1999)
     Asia for flute, viola and harp (2008); Tre Media Musikverlage
     BACH for viola solo (2008); Tre Media Musikverlage
     Chant d'adieux (Song of Farewell) for violin and viola (2000); Tre Media Musikverlage
     Dos Olivos for singing violinist and viola (2001)
     Questions pour un millénaire (Questions for a Millennium) for violin and viola (also recitating) (2001)
 Alexander Dargomyzhsky (1813–1869)
     Elegy (Элегия) for viola and piano (1844); transcription by Vadim Borisovsky (1949); original Не спрашивай, зачем: Элегия (Do Not Ask Why) for voice and piano with words by Alexander Pushkin; Muzgiz;  (State Music Publishing House)
     She Is Coming (Она придёт: Элегиа), Elegy for voice, viola (or cello) and piano (1843); words by Nikolay Yazykov
 Christian Darnton (1905–1981)
     Concerto for viola and string orchestra (1933–1935)
 Vladimir Dashkevich (b. 1934)
     Concerto No. 1 (Альтовый концерт №1) for viola and orchestra (2007)
     Concerto No. 2 (Альтовый концерт №2) for viola and orchestra (2007)
     Sonata in Three Movements (Соната в трех частях) for viola and piano (2004)
 Michael Daugherty (b. 1954)
     Diamond in the Rough for violin, viola and percussion (2006); Boosey & Hawkes
     Viola Zombie for 2 violas (1991); Peermusic Classical
 Félicien-César David (1810–1876)
     La Nuit, Thème de l'ode-symphonie "Le désert" for viola and piano (1844); transcription of "Hymne à la nuit" by Henri Vieuxtemps (c.1846); original for tenor and orchestra
 Ferdinand David (1810–1873)
     Concertino in B major for bassoon or viola and orchestra, Op. 12 (published 1840)
 Gyula Dávid (1913–1977)
     A rózsalángolás (The Burning Rose), Chamber Music for female voice, flute and viola (1966); words by István Vas; Editio Musica Budapest
     Concerto for viola and orchestra (1950); Editio Musica Budapest
     Pezzo (Piece) for viola and piano (1974); Editio Musica Budapest
     Sonatina for viola and piano (1969); Editio Musica Budapest
 Johann Nepomuk David (1895–1977)
     Melancholia for viola and chamber orchestra, Op. 53 (1958); Breitkopf und Härtel
     Sonata in B major for clarinet and viola, Op. 32 No. 4 (1948); Breitkopf und Härtel
     Sonata for flute and viola, Op. 32 No. 1 (1943); Breitkopf und Härtel
     Sonata for viola solo, Op. 31 No. 3 (1947); Breitkopf und Härtel
 Thomas Christian David (1925–2006)
     Concerto Grosso for 2 violas, cello and double bass with string orchestra (1978)
     Duo-Sonata No. 1 for violin and viola (1980); Verlag Doblinger
     Sonata for cello (or viola) and guitar (1980); Verlag Doblinger
     Sonatina for flute and viola (1958); Verlag Doblinger
     Variationen über ein deutsches Volkslied (Variations on a German Folk Song) for viola and positive organ (1966); Verlag Doblinger
 Brent Michael Davids (b. 1959)
     Viola Jokes for tenor and viola (2005)
 Robert Davidson (b. 1965)
     Adeney cycle for violin and viola (1990); Australian Music Centre
     Arch, Canon for 3 violas or solo viola with prerecorded accompaniment (1992); Australian Music Centre
     Lento for viola and piano (1997); Australian Music Centre
     Message ground, Canon for 2 violas or solo viola and digital delay with accompaniment (1996); Australian Music Centre
     Spiral, Canon for 3 violas or volo viola with digital delay or prerecorded accompaniment (2000); Australian Music Centre
 Peter Maxwell Davies (1934–2016)
     Birthday Music for John for flute, viola and cello, Op. 109 (1983); Chester Music
     The Door of the Sun for viola solo, J. 132, Op. 64 (1975); Boosey & Hawkes
     Midhouse Air for violin and viola, Op. 180a (1996); Chester Music
     6 Sorano Variants for viola solo, Op. 320 (2012); Boosey & Hawkes
     Strathclyde Concerto No. 5 for violin, viola and string orchestra, J. 245, Op. 151 (1991); Boosey & Hawkes
 Tansy Davies (b. 1973)
     Small Black Stone for viola and piano (2000); British Music Information Centre
     Trio for clarinet, viola and piano (2002); British Music Information Centre
 Donald R. Davis (b. 1957)
     No Exit (Huis Clos) for flute, viola and harp (1996); Fatrock Ink
 Jon Deak (b. 1943)
     Eyeore Has a Birthday for viola, double bass and piano (1991); Carl Fischer
     Metaphor for viola solo/narrator (1980, 1991); original for cello solo/narrator; Carl Fischer
     The Snow Queen for narrator, viola, double bass and orchestra (1991); story by Hans Christian Andersen; Carl Fischer
 Brett Dean (b. 1961)
     Concerto for viola and orchestra (2004); Bote & Bock; Boosey & Hawkes
     Intimate Decisions for solo viola (1996); Bote & Bock; Boosey & Hawkes
     Night Window, Music for clarinet, viola and piano (1993); Bote & Bock; Boosey & Hawkes
     One of a Kind for viola and tape (1998, 2012); Bote & Bock; Boosey & Hawkes
     Skizzen für Siegbert (Sketches for Siegbert) for viola solo (2011); Bote & Bock; Boosey & Hawkes
     some birthday... for 2 violas and cello (1992); Bote & Bock; Boosey & Hawkes
     Testament for 12 violas (2002); Bote & Bock; Boosey & Hawkes
     Wendezeit (Homage to F.C.) for 5 violas (1988); Bote & Bock; Boosey & Hawkes
 Raymond Deane (b. 1953)
     A Baroque Session (with Carolan and Friends) for violin, viola, cello and string orchestra (2009); Ireland Contemporary Music Centre
     Brève for viola solo (2003); Ireland Contemporary Music Centre
     Concursus for violin, viola and string orchestra (2004); Ireland Contemporary Music Centre
     Hungarian Jewish Melodies for violin, viola, cello and string orchestra (2007); Ireland Contemporary Music Centre
     So Quiet Now... for soprano, viola and piano (1996); Ireland Contemporary Music Centre
     Two Songs for Paris for mezzo-soprano, viola and piano (1995); Ireland Contemporary Music Centre
 Jerome de Bromhead (b. 1945)
     Fright Fight or Flight for viola solo (2009); Ireland Contemporary Music Centre
     Prelude for viola and piano (1977); Ireland Contemporary Music Centre
Claude Debussy (1862–1918)
     Sonata for flute, viola and harp, L. 137 (1915)
 Michel Decoust (b. 1936)
     Les Galeries de pierres for viola solo (1984); Éditions Salabert
     Sun for solo viola and 12 string instruments (1971); Éditions Durand
 Fernande Decruck (1896–1954)
     Sonate en ut dièse (Sonata in C) for alto saxophone or viola and orchestra (or piano) (1930s?; published 1943); Éditions Costallat; Éditions Gérard Billaudot
 Jean-Michel Defaye (b. 1932)
     Amplitude for viola and piano (1980); Éditions Max Eschig
 Helmut Degen (1911–1995)
     Sonata for flute and viola (1963); N. Simrock
     Sonata for viola and piano (1940); Willy Müller, Süddeutscher Musikverlag
     Stück from Die grosse Reihe for viola solo (1954); Willy Müller, Süddeutscher Musikverlag
     10 Stücke (10 Pieces) for violin and viola; Willy Müller, Süddeutscher Musikverlag
     Unisono-Stücke 1950 for violin, or viola, or cello solo, or unison ensemble (1950); Heinrichshofen's Verlag
 Adam de la Cour (b. 1979)
     Block for viola solo (2012)
 Marcel Delannoy (1898–1962)
     Le Dernier chant de la Sulamite, Cantata for alto, viola and piano, Op. 63 (1961); words by Gérard Murail; Éditions Musicales Transatlantiques
 Jack Delano (1914–1997)
     Ofrenda Musical (Musical Offering) for viola, horn and string orchestra (1959); Peer Music Classical
     Sonata in A minor for viola and piano (1953)
 Lex van Delden (1919–1988)
     Concerto for violin, viola, double bass and orchestra, Op. 88 (1965); Donemus
     Suite for viola and piano, Op. 4 (1939); Donemus; C.F. Peters
 Frederick Delius (1862–1934)
     Caprice and Elegy for viola and piano (1930); original for cello and orchestra; adaptation by Lionel Tertis; Boosey and Hawkes
     Serenade from the Drama Hassan (1920–1923); transcription by Lionel Tertis; Boosey and Hawkes
     Sonata No. 2 for viola and piano (1923); original for violin and piano; 1929 adaptation by Lionel Tertis; Boosey and Hawkes
     Sonata No. 3 for viola and piano (1930); original for violin and piano; 1932 adaptation by Lionel Tertis; Boosey and Hawkes
 Norman Dello Joio (1913–2008)
     Lyric Fantasies for viola and string orchestra (1975); Associated Music Publishers
 Thomas Demenga (b. 1954)
     Duo? o, du– for viola and cello (1985); Müller & Schade
     Musik für leere Saiten und Solo for solo viola and viola ensemble (1997)
 Norman Demuth (1898–1968)
     Concerto for viola and orchestra (1951)
     Suite for viola solo; Hinrichsen Edition
 Michael Denhoff (b. 1955)
     Champs de Mars, Inventions after Marc Chagall for viola and piano, Op. 9 (1975); Breitkopf & Härtel
     Moment Musical for viola and piano (1973)
     Silence, et puis for alto voice and viola, Op. 101 (2006); Edition Gravis
     Since Atwain (II) for viola and cello, Op. 66b (1992); Edition Gravis
     Sounds and Shadows for viola, string quartet and piano, Op. 86 (1999); Edition Gravis
     Tenebrae for viola and piano, Op. 82 (1997); Edition Gravis
     To and Fro in Shadow, "Nebenweg IV" for viola and piano, Op. 83d (1998–1999); Edition Gravis
     Two Once So One for viola, cello and string quartet, Op. 66 (1992); Edition Gravis
     Zwei Stücke (Two Pieces) for viola and cello (2007)
 Edison Denisov (1929–1996)
     Chamber Music for viola, harpsichord and string orchestra (1982); Hans Sikorski
     Concerto for 2 violas, harpsichord and string orchestra (1984); Boosey & Hawkes
     Concerto for viola and orchestra (1986); Hans Sikorski
     Duo for flute and viola (1989); Éditions Alphonse Leduc; United Music Publishers
     Es ist genug (It Is Enough), Variations on "Es ist genug", theme of Bach's Choral for viola and piano (1984); for viola and flute, oboe, celeste and string quintet (1986); Boosey & Hawkes
     Three Pictures after Paul Klee (Три картины Пауля Клее; Trois Tableaux de Paul Klee; Drei Bilder nach Paul Klee) for viola and ensemble (1984–1985); VEB Deutscher Verlag für Musik
        Diana in the Autumn Wind (Диана в осеннем ветре; Diane dans le vent d'automne; Diana im Herbstwind) for viola, piano, vibraphone and double bass (1984)
        Senecio (Сенечо) for viola solo (1985)
        A Child on the Platform (Ребёнок на перроне; L'enfant sur le perron; Kind an der Freitreppe) for viola, oboe, horn, piano, vibraphone and double bass (1985)
 Frank Denyer (b. 1943)
     Marine Residua for shell trumpets, viola and 2 percussionists (1986)
     Stalks for shakuhachi, bass recorder and viola (1986)
     Woman, Viola and Crow for female violist (viola, voice and percussion sounds) (2004)
 Fabrizio De Rossi Re (b. 1960)
     Erato, amore mio (Erato, My Love) for viola and piano (2001)
     Krono e gli altri dèmoni e dèi (Cronus and the Other Demons and Gods) for clarinet and viola (1987)
     Palus Epidemiarum for viola, cello and double bass (1988)
 Manuel De Sica (1949–2014)
     Adagio for viola or clarinet and piano (1999); Edizioni Sugar Music
     Solo for viola (1973)
     Una breve vacanza (A Brief Vacation) for viola and string orchestra (1973); Edizioni Sugar Music
 Paul Dessau (1894–1979)
     Bagatelles for viola and piano (1975)
     Sonatine for viola and piano (1929); Dresdner Verlag
 François Devienne (1759–1803)
     6 Duos Concertants for flute and viola, Op. 5 (c.1780); Amadeus Verlag
 Frédéric Devreese (1929–2020)
     Benvenuta, Suite for viola and piano (1983–2001); CeBeDeM
     Canti for cello or viola and piano (2000); CeBeDeM
     Circles for viola and piano (2007); CeBeDeM
 David Diamond (1915–2005)
     Vocalises for high voice and viola (1935, revised 1956); Southern Music Publishing
 Gustavo Díaz-Jerez (b. 1970)
     Sonata for viola and piano (2003); Editorial Periferia Música
 Emma Lou Diemer (b. 1927)
     Homage to Paderewski for viola and piano (1997); Seesaw Music
     Lovely Song for viola and violin (one player) with piano (1993); Seesaw Music
 Caspar Diethelm (1926–1997)
     Apfel des Paris (Apple of Paris), Concerto da Camera for violin, viola, piano, string orchestra and percussion, Op. 313 (1995)
     Betruf for viola solo, Op. 317 (1995)
     Capoliade: in memoriam Petrus Sebastianus de Capol for viola and harpsichord (or piano), Op. 162 (1979)
     Concerto for viola and chamber orchestra, Op. 19 (1955)
     Concerto diletto No. 3 for 3 violins, viola and string orchestra, Op. 158 (1979, 1991)
     Die goldene Selket, Hymn for viola, string orchestra and vibraphone, Op. 295 (1993)
     Duet "Dialogus auctoris atque editoris" for viola and bass clarinet, Op. 168 (1979); Amadeus Verlag
     Duo for viola and cello, Op. 107 (1972); Amadeus Verlag
     Duo for viola and double bass, Op. 188 (1981)
     Jadis, Ballet Suite for flute, viola and harp, Op. 297 (1993)
     Pirouette, Trio for flute, viola and double bass, Op. 311 (1994)
     Sonata for viola and piano, Op. 105 (1972)
     Sonata I for viola solo, Op. 118 (1974); Amadeus Verlag
     Sonata II for viola solo, Op. 121 (1974); Amadeus Verlag
 James Dillon (b. 1950)
     Siorram (In an Enchanted Dream) for viola solo (1992); Edition Peters
     Time Lag Zero for female voice and viola (1982); Edition Peters
 Lawrence Dillon (b. 1959)
     Bacchus Chaconne for 2 violins, or violin and viola (1990);  American Composers Alliance
     Still Point for mezzo-soprano, viola and piano (2007); American Composers Alliance
 Violeta Dinescu (b. 1953)
     Dialogo for flute (or clarinet) and viola (1980)
     Din cimpoiu for viola solo (1984); Astoria Verlag
     Euraculos for clarinet and viola (1982)
     L'étranger (The Stranger) for viola and zither (1995)
     Ostrov I for viola solo (1987)
     Rand for clarinet and viola (1996)
     Sonata for viola and piano (1975)
 Renato Dionisi (1910–2000)
     Sonatina for viola and piano (1983); Edizioni Suvini Zerboni
     Tre movimenti (3 Movements) for viola and string orchestra (1966); Edizioni Musicali G. Zanibon
 Carl Ditters von Dittersdorf (1739–1799)
     Concerto in F major for viola and orchestra, K. 168 (1776–1777)
     Duo in E major for viola and cello, K. 218
     Sinfonia Concertante in D major for viola, double bass and orchestra, K. 127 (1766)
     Sonata in E major for viola and double bass
     Sonata in E major for viola and piano
     6 Sonatas for 2 violins and viola, Op. 2
 Paul-Heinz Dittrich (1930–2020)
     Un coup d'aile, 13 Fragments for viola solo (1996); Deutscher Verlag für Musik
 Michael Djupstrom (b. 1980)
     Walimai for alto saxophone (or viola) and piano (2005); winner of the 2012 Maurice Gardner Composition Competition sponsored by the American Viola Society
 Václav Dobiáš (1909–1978)
     Balada (Ballad) for viola and piano (1944)
 Antun Dobronić (1878–1955)
     Priče iz mog zavičaja (Stories from My Homeland) for 4 violas
     Ugođaji (Vibes) for 4 violas (published 2005); Muzički Informativni Centar
 Charles Dodge (b. 1942)
     Viola Elegy for viola and tape (1987); North Cape Music; Frog Peak Music
 Stephen Dodgson (1924–2013)
     Caprice after Puck for viola solo (1978); British Music Information Centre
     Echoes of Autumn for viola and guitar (1998); British Music Information Centre
     Four Fancies for viola and piano (1964); Chappell Music
     Seven Miniatures for viola and piano (1964); Associated Board of the Royal Schools of Music; British Music Information Centre
     Sonata for viola and piano (1952)
 Samuel Dolin (1917–2002)
     Kinesis I and Kinesis II for viola (or cello, or trombone, or tuba) and piano (1981); Canadian Music Centre
 František Domažlický (1913–1997)
     Concerto for viola and orchestra, Op. 36 (1965–1966); Český Hudební Fond; Schott Music Panton
     Hudba pro housle a violu (Music for Violin and Viola), Op. 78 (1993); Český Hudební Fond
     Pět bagatel (Five Bagatelles) for viola and piano, Op. 41 (1969); Český Hudební Fond
 Gerd Domhardt (1945–1997)
     Concerto for viola and orchestra; Breitkopf und Härtel
 Franco Donatoni (1927–2000)
     Ali, 2 Pieces for viola solo (1977); Ricordi
     Small II for flute, viola and harp (1993); Ricordi
     Sonata for viola solo (1952); Edizioni Drago; Edizioni Musicali G. Zanibon
 Josef Friedrich Doppelbauer (1918–1989)
     Concerto for viola and small orchestra (1953, revised 1968); Verlag Doblinger
     Sonata for viola solo (1977); Verlag Doblinger
 Cornelis Dopper (1870–1939)
     Nocturne in F major for viola and orchestra (or organ) (1937)
 Antal Doráti (1906–1988)
     Adagio for viola and piano (1987); Müller & Schade
 Daniel Dorff (b. 1956)
     Deep Funk, Part 2, Dance Sonata for viola solo (2002); Theodore Presser Company
     Spark for viola solo (2009)
 Friedrich Dotzauer (1783–1860)
     Concertino in A major for viola and orchestra, Op. 89 (c.1825); N. Simrock
 Jaroslav Doubrava (1909–1960)
     Sonata for viola solo (1945)
 Demetrius Constantine Dounis (1886–1954)
     Specific Technical Exercises for Viola (Left Hand – Bow Arm), Op. 25 (1941)
 Daniel Doura (b. 1957)
     Archi for violin and viola (1985)
     Animas Trio for flute, viola and harp (1987)
 Felix Draeseke (1835–1913)
     Sonata No. 1 in C minor for viola (viola alta) and piano, WoO 21 (1892)
     Sonata No. 2 in F major for viola (viola alta) and piano, WoO 26 (1901–1902)
 Dimitris Dragatakis (1914–2001)
     Adagio for solo viola, string orchestra and piano (1969)
     Concerto (Κοντσέρτο για βιόλα και ορχήστρα) for viola and orchestra (1992)
     Duo (Ντούο για βιόλα και πιάνο) for viola and piano (1984); Philippos Nakas Music House
     Music for Three (Μουσική για τρεις) for viola, horn, piano (1969)
     Trio (Τρίο για 2 βιολιά και βιόλα) for 2 violins and viola (1960)
 Oliver Drechsel (b. 1973)
     Sonatina serena for viola and clarinet, Op. 26 (1997); Edition Dohr
 Erwin Dressel (1909–1972)
     Partita for alto saxophone (or clarinet, or viola) and piano (1965); Ries & Erler Musikverlag
 George Dreyfus (b. 1928)
     Sonata for violin and viola (1989); Australian Music Centre
     Symphonie Concertante for bassoon, violin, viola, cello and string orchestra (1978); Australian Music Centre
 Felix Dreyschock (1860–1906)
     Andante religioso in D major for viola and piano, Op. 28 (1894); Otto Junne; Elibron Classics
 Johannes Driessler (1921–1998)
     Concerto for string trio and orchestra, Op. 54 (1963)
     Fünf Stücke (5 Pieces) for viola and piano, Op. 24 No. 3b (1952); Bärenreiter-Verlag
     Sonata for viola solo, Op. 3 No. 1 (1946); Hinnenthal Verlag; Bärenreiter-Verlag
     Tripartita for viola and harpsichord, Op. 58 No. 3 (1966)
 Riccardo Drigo (1846–1930)
     Meditazione in C major for viola, cello and string orchestra (or piano)
 Duncan Druce (1939–2015)
     Chiasmata for 2 violas (1972)
     Jugalbundi for clarinet and viola (1968)
 Jacob Druckman (1928–1996)
     Concerto for viola and orchestra (1978); Boosey & Hawkes
 Jiří Družecký (Georg Druschetzky) (1745–1819)
     Concerto in D major for viola and orchestra (published 1962); N. Simrock
 Fyodor Druzhinin (1932–2007)
     Fantasia for viola and orchestra (1980)
     Sinfonia a due, Duet for 2 violas (published 2003); Kompozitor
     Sonata for viola solo (1959); Kompozitor; Sikorski
     Variations for viola solo (1968); Kompozitor
 Pierre Max Dubois (1930–1995)
     Suite de dances for viola and string orchestra with harp ad libitum (1960); Éditions Alphonse Leduc
 Théodore Dubois (1837–1924)
     Cantabile (or Andante Cantabile) in G major for viola (or cello) and piano (1886)
     Terzettino in E major for flute, viola and harp (1905); Éditions Heugel; Ut Orpheus Edizioni
 Denis Dufour (b. 1953)
     Altitude for viola solo, Op. 136 (2006)
     En sursaut for soprano and viola, Op. 2 (1977)
     Jeu délicieux for tenor and viola, Op. 56 (1989)
     Le crin s'ébruite for viola and percussion, Op. 3 (1977); Maison Ona
 Hugues Dufourt (b. 1943)
     Le Cyprès blanc (The White Cypress) for viola and large orchestra (2003–2004); Éditions Henry Lemoine
 Antoine Duhamel (1925–2014)
     Lamento-Mémoire: Récitation concertante for viola and chamber orchestra (1996); Éditions Alphonse Leduc; United Music Publishers
 Maurice Duhamel (1884–1940)
     Soniou an dous, Engagement Songs for cello or viola and piano (1911); Rouart, Lerolle & Cie
 John Woods Duke (1899–1984)
     Melody in E for viola and piano (1946); Elkan-Vogel
     Narrative for viola and piano (1942)
     Suite for Viola Alone (1933); The Valley Music Press; American Viola Society Publications
     Three Sonnets by Edna St. Vincent Millay for voice, viola and piano (1959); Independent Music Publishers
 Iancu Dumitrescu (b. 1944)
     Holzwege for Ioan-Marius Lacraru for viola solo (or 2 violas) (1987)
     Movemur III for viola solo (1978)
     Soliloquium for Vladimir Mendelsohn for viola solo (1978)
 Thomas Dunhill (1877–1946)
     4 Pieces for viola and piano (1928); Stainer & Bell; J. Williams
     In Courtly Company
     Alla Sarabanda
     The Willow Brook
     Meditation on a Study by Schumann
     Phantasy-Trio in E major for violin, viola and piano, Op. 36 (1911); Stainer & Bell; A.P. Schmidt; Prairie Dawg Press
     Pleasantries for 2 violins and viola, Op. 63 (1925); J.B. Cramer
     Triptych, 3 Impressions for viola and orchestra, Op. 99 (1942); Oxford University Press
 Hubert du Plessis (1922–2011)
     Sonata for viola and piano, Op. 43 (1977)
 Albert Dupuis (1877–1967)
     Aria for viola and piano or orchestra
     Chanson affectueuse for viola and piano
     Chant d'adieu for viola and piano (1932)
     Chant du retour for viola and piano
     Chopin for viola and piano
     Evocation d'orient for viola (or violin) and piano
     Grieg for viola and piano
     La jeune fille au rouet for viola and piano
     Méditation for viola and piano
     Mendelssohn for viola and piano (1933)
     Petite Variation for viola and piano
     Schumann for viola and piano
 Joël-François Durand (b. 1954)
     Cinq Duos (5 Duos) for violin and viola (1999); Éditions Durand
     La Mesure des choses III: La Mesure de la terre et du feu for oboe and viola (1999); Éditions Durand
     Le Tombeau de Rameau for flute, viola and harp (2008); Éditions Musicales Européennes
 Louis Durey (1888–1979)
     5 Duos (from 10 Inventions) for violin and viola, Op. 35b (1924–1927, revised 1964); Billaudot; E.F.M. Technisonor
 Frédéric Durieux (b. 1959)
     Strophe en Marge for viola and piano (1986); Collection Panorama: Œuvres Contemporaines, Volume 3 (1989); Éditions Gérard Billaudot; United Music Publishers
 Zsolt Durkó (1934–1997)
     Varianti for viola and piano (1974); Editio Musica Budapest
 Lucien Durosoir (1878–1955)
     Poème for violin, viola and orchestra (1920); Symétrie; Éditions M.e.G.e.P.
     Vitrail (Stained-glass Window) for viola and piano (1934); Symétrie; Éditions M.e.G.e.P.
 Matthias Durst (1815–1875)
     Adagio for 4 violas (c.1870); American Viola Society Publications
 Maurice Duruflé (1902–1986)
     Prélude, Récitatif et Variations for flute, viola and piano, Op. 3 (1928); Éditions Durand
 Pascal Dusapin (b. 1955)
     In Nomine for viola solo (2000); Éditions Salabert
     Inside for viola solo (1980); Éditions Salabert
     Ohimé, Duo No. 1 for violin and viola (1992); Éditions Salabert
 Alphonse Duvernoy (1842–1907)
     Lied in A minor for viola and piano, Op. 47 (1901); J. Hamelle
 Balys Dvarionas (1904–1972)
     Tema su variacijomis (Theme and Variations) for viola and piano (1946); original for bassoon and piano;  (State Music Publishing House)
 George Dyson (1883–1964)
     Prelude, Fantasy and Chaconne for cello (or viola) and small orchestra (or piano) (1935); Novello & Co.

E
 John Eaton (1935–2015)
     Study for Viola and Two Tape Recorders (1970)
     Overture for the Dedication of a House for mezzo-soprano, boy soprano, viola and synthesizer (1990)
 Otto Ebel von Sosen (1899–1974)
     Arioso im alten Stil (Arioso in the Old Style) for clarinet (or viola) and string orchestra, Op. 15 (1922); Henry Litolff's Verlag; Edition Peters
 Petr Eben (1929–2007)
     Písně nelaskavé (Unkind Songs) for alto and viola (1963); Panton Praha
     Rorate coeli, Fantasy for viola and organ (1982); Universal Edition
 Sophie Carmen Eckhardt-Gramatté (1899–1974)
     Duo for viola and cello, E. 109 (1944); Canadian Music Centre
     Lagrime for viola (or cello) and piano, E. 61 (1928); Canadian Music Centre
 Helmut Eder (1916–2005)
    Concertino for viola, winds and percussion, Op. 124 (2002); Doblinger
     Concerto "Der reisende Schatten" for viola and orchestra, Op. 116 (1999); Doblinger
     Jeu parti for viola and piano, Op. 102 (1993); Doblinger
     3 Sätze (3 Movements) for viola, double bass and piano, Op. 73 No. 3 (1983); Doblinger
     Sonatina for viola and piano, Op. 34 No. 2 (1963); Doblinger
 Ross Edwards (b. 1943)
     Ecstatic Dance II for 2 violas, or viola and cello (1990); G. Ricordi London; Australian Music Centre
     Enyato II for viola solo (1994); G. Ricordi London; Australian Music Centre
 René Eespere (b. 1953)
     Concerto for viola and orchestra (1996, 1998); Edition 49
 Cecil Effinger (1914–1990)
     Divertimento for violin, viola and piano, Op. 51 (1950)
     Melody for clarinet or viola and piano, Op. 43 No. 1 (1947); Theodore Presser Compan
 Klaus Egge (1906–1979)
     Duo Concertante for violin and viola, Op. 23 (1950); Harald Lyche Musikkforlag
 Abel Ehrlich (1915–2003)
     About Different Jugs, 3 Pieces for violin and viola (1991); Israeli Music Center
     And All Traces of Him Were Lost, Music for viola and piano (1998); Israeli Music Center
     And I'm Looking Down on Earth for 2 violins and viola (1999); Israeli Music Center
     Batri lishnayim! for viola and clarinet, (Cycle I. Frances No. 2) (1991); Israeli Music Center
     A Being of Sound for viola and 5 singers (1998); Israeli Music Center
     Bin allein unter vielen Leuten for viola and piano (1997); Israeli Music Center
     Bridge for soprano, viola and trombone (1998); Israeli Music Center
     Bülbul for female choir, violin and viola (1991); Israeli Music Center
     Dance of the Macabre Mice for tenor, flute and viola (1995); Israeli Music Center
     Dans le vieux parc (Evoqué le passé I) for violin and viola (1995); Israeli Music Center
     Die Memel for viola solo (1998); Israeli Music Center
     A Dissociated Abundance of Being for violin and viola (1996); Israeli Music Center
     Drawing Bust of a Child for oboe and 3 violas (1999); Israeli Music Center
     Ein ernster Augenbuck for violin and viola (2001); Israeli Music Center
     El Ciego for violin and viola (1991); Israeli Music Center
     Être dans l'enchantement for flute, viola and piano (2000); Israeli Music Center
     Exercise in Calmness for flute, viola and harp (1998); Israeli Music Center
     From the Diary of a Gravitational-Waves-Scientist, for viola and piano (1995); Israeli Music Center
     From This You May Learn for flute, viola and piano (1955); Israeli Music Center
     Für Kolja: Psalm LXIII for violin and viola (1997); Israeli Music Center
     A Geological Layer for clarinet and viola (1988); Israeli Music Center
     Greetings From 11.1.1991 for viola and piano (1991); Israeli Music Center
     Greetings From 13.1.1991 for viola and piano (1991); Israeli Music Center
     Greetings From 14.1.1991 for viola and piano (1991); Israeli Music Center
     Greetings From 15.1.1991 for viola and piano (1991); Israeli Music Center
     Hatsclavio for trumpet, clarinet and viola (1988); Israeli Music Center
     He Thinks He Is at Rest for alto, clarinet and viola (1998); Israeli Music Center
     He Who Is Always Alone for 4 violas (2001); Israeli Music Center
     Honey Out of the Hive for violin, viola and piano (1990); Israeli Music Center
     I Told My Ways for guitar and viola (1997); Israeli Music Center
     In 1500 Columbus for violin and viola (1990); Israeli Music Center
     In Memory of Dan Pagis for violin and viola (1996); Israeli Music Center
     Let Tears Toll for the Dead for viola and piano (2007); Israeli Music Center
     Let's Presume No. 2 for viola and cello (1991); Israeli Music Center
     A Man Draws a Figure on a Wall for violin and viola (1998); Israeli Music Center
     May There Be Abundant Peace for viola and guitar (1993); Israeli Music Center
     Movement for Trio for viola, horn and piano (2000); Israeli Music Center
     Movilna mane for violin and viola (1990); Israeli Music Center
     Music for Flute and Viola (1964); Israeli Music Center
     Music for Viola and Double Bass (1998); Israeli Music Center
     Nimusin for mixed choir, violin and viola (1990); Israeli Music Center
     On Seeing the Elgin Marbles for tenor and viola (1997); Israeli Music Center
     On the Other Hand for viola and piano (1998); Israeli Music Center
     On the Road Home for alto, tenor and viola (1995); Israeli Music Center
     Overshadowed for clarinet, violin and viola (1998); Israeli Music Center
     Papo's Love Song for tenor, viola and clarinet (1991); Israeli Music Center
     Process for violin and viola (1988); Israeli Music Center
     Prosa 1917 for 2 tenors and 1 viola (1995); Israeli Music Center
     Psalm 129 for viola solo (1995); Israeli Music Center
     Reactions for violin and viola (2001); Israeli Music Center
     Registered Letter for clarinet, viola and double bass (1993); Israeli Music Center
     Released and Compensated for viola and piano (1990); Israeli Music Center
     Rosen schreiten for soprano and viola (1990); Israeli Music Center
     Sand-Glass for viola and string orchestra (1997); Israeli Music Center
     September 1998 for viola, cello and double bass (1998); Israeli Music Center
     Suite for horn, viola and guitar (1996); Israeli Music Center
     Suspicious Object for tenor and viola (1996); Israeli Music Center
     Takes a Hint for viola and cello (2000); Israeli Music Center
     That's in the Air for high voice, viola and cello (2001); Israeli Music Center
     The Cry of Ibn Saruk for 4 violas (2002); Israeli Music Center
     The Hawk for tenor, viola and trombone (1997); Israeli Music Center
     The Night of the Owl for tenor and viola (2000); Israeli Music Center
     This Year Too (גם השנה) for baritone, clarinet and viola (1993); Israeli Music Center
     Three Dialogues for violin and viola (1997); Israeli Music Center
     Three Gloomy Fates for viola, horn and bass clarinet (1993); Israeli Music Center
     Three Movements for Trio for clarinet, viola and bassoon (1992); Israeli Music Center
     Three Poems for Three Instruments for flute, violin and viola (1998); Israeli Music Center
     To Be Abandoned for violin and viola (1997); Israeli Music Center
     Trio for 2 violins and viola (1998); Israeli Music Center
     Trio in 3 Movements for viola, clarinet and piano (2001); Israeli Music Center
     Viola & Tape for viola and live electronics (1993); Israeli Music Center
     Vorschlag zu einer Gebrauchsanweisung for reciter, clarinet and viola (1999); Israeli Music Center
     What is the Advantage II for viola solo (1995); Israeli Music Center
     Within the Prism for flute and viola (2001); Israeli Music Center
 Ernst Eichner (1740–1777)
     Sechs Duette (6 Duets) for violin and viola, Op. 10
 Ludovico Einaudi (b. 1955)
     5 Duetti for violin and viola (1988); Ricordi
 Gottfried von Einem (1918–1996)
     Solo Sonata for viola, Op. 60 (1980); Edition Schott
 Maija Einfelde (b. 1939)
     Maestoso for viola and piano
     Pirms saules rieta (Before Sunset) for clarinet, viola and piano (1994); Musica Baltica
     Prelūdija (Prelude) for oboe and viola (1999); Musica Baltica
     Sonāte meditācija (Sonata-Meditation) for viola and piano (1982); Musica Baltica
 Karólína Eiríksdóttir (b. 1951)
     Na Carenza for mezzo-soprano, oboe and viola (1993); Íslenzk Tónverkamiðstöð
     Strenglag (String Tune) for viola and piano (2002); Íslenzk Tónverkamiðstöð
 Will Eisenmann (1906–1992)
     Marienlegende for high voice, viola and piano, Op. 50 (1950); words by Klabund
     Musik for viola and piano, Op. 60 (1957)
     Sänge eines fahrenden Spielmanns for alto, viola and piano, Op. 56 (1954); words by Stefan George
 Edward Elgar (1857–1934)
     Canto Popolare for viola and piano (1904); transcription by the composer from the concert-overture In the South (Alassio), Op. 50 (1903–1904); Novello & Co.
     Concerto in E minor for viola and orchestra, Op. 85 (1918–1919); 1929 adaptation of the Cello Concerto by Lionel Tertis; Novello & Co.
 Brian Elias (b. 1948)
     But When I Sleep ... for viola solo (1987); Chester Music
 Manuel de Elías (b. 1939)
     Concierto de cámara for viola, percussion and string orchestra (1992)
     Elegía for viola and piano (1962)
     Preludio (Pieza de cámara No. 1) for viola solo (1962)
     Preludio for viola solo (1976)
 Anders Eliasson (1947–2013)
     Concerto for violin, viola and chamber orchestra (2009); Gehrmans Musikförlag
 Heino Eller (1887–1970)
     Moderato sostenuto in D minor for voice, viola and piano (1921)
 Paul Elwood (b. 1958)
     Capricious Apparitions for 2 violas and bowed banjo (2009)
 Ivo van Emmerik (b. 1961)
     ((( ))), 5 Pieces for Various Instruments: No. 1 for viola solo (1988)
     (((O))) for viola solo (1991)
     (((O)))2 for viola solo (1993)
 František Gregor Emmert (1940–2015)
     Concerto for viola and orchestra (1965); Český Hudební Fond
     Magnificat na francouzský text (Magnificat on French Text) for mezzo-soprano, clarinet, viola and piano (2002); Český Hudební Fond
     Sonata for viola solo (1998); Český Hudební Fond
     Trio for clarinet, viola and piano (1981); Český Hudební Fond
 George Enescu (1881–1955)
     Doină for baritone, viola and cello (1905); Editura Muzicală, Bucharest; Éditions Salabert
     Piesă de concert (Concertpiece) for viola and piano (1906)
 Mark Engebretson (b. 1964)
     Where Does Love Go? for viola and live electronics (2003); Effiny Music
 Manuel Enríquez (1926–1994)
     Cuatro Piezas (4 Pieces) for viola and piano (1962)
     Tres Invenciones (3 Inventions) for flute and viola (1964)
 Péter Eötvös (b. 1944)
     désaccord for 2 violas (2001); Edition Ricordi München
     Replica for viola and orchestra (1998); Edition Ricordi München
 David Epstein (1930–2002)
     Fantasy Variations for viola solo (1963); MCA Music
 Donald Erb (1927–2008)
     Harold's Trip to the Sky, Trio for viola, prepared piano and percussion (1972); Merion Music; Theodore Presser Company
 Heimo Erbse (1924–2005)
     4 lyrische Stücke (4 Lyrical Pieces) for viola and piano, Op. 39c (1978); original for bassoon and piano; Verlag Doblinger
 Dietrich Erdmann (1917–2009)
     Concertino for viola (or English horn or clarinet) and ensemble of plucked instruments (1986); Volksmusikverlag Joachim Trekel
     Prisma for viola and piano (1982–1983); Breitkopf & Härtel
 Hans-Ola Ericsson (b. 1958)
     Musik för en sjuk värld (Niemandsland II) (Music for a Sick World) for solo viola and chamber orchestra (1980–1981); STIM; Swedish Music Information Centre
 Iván Erőd (1936–2019)
     Concerto for viola and orchestra, Op. 30 (1979–1980); Ludwig Doblinger Musikverlag
     Verseny-fantázia (Fantasy Concertante; Konzertante Fantasie) for viola and string orchestra, Op. 35 (1980–1981); Ludwig Doblinger Musikverlag
     Virágcsendélet (Flower Piece; Blumenstück) for viola solo, Op. 62 (1994); Ludwig Doblinger Musikverlag
 Pozzi Escot (b. 1933)
     Bels dous amics for soprano, oboe and viola (1993); Publication Contact International
     Mirabilis I for viola and electronic tape (1990); Publication Contact International
 Andrei Eshpai (1925–2015)
     Concerto for viola and orchestra (1987); Muzyka
 Michele Esposito (1855–1929)
     2 Pieces for viola and piano, Op. 22 (1881)
 Julio Estrada (b. 1943)
     Yuunohui'ome for viola solo, E. 18b (1990); Éditions Salabert
 Alvin Etler (1913–1973)
     Duo for oboe (or flute, or violin) and viola (or clarinet) (1945); New Valley Music Press
     Sonata for oboe, clarinet and viola (1947); The Valley Music Press
     Sonata for viola and harpsichord (1959); Continuo Music Press; Associated Music Publishers
 Pierre Even (b. 1946)
     Concertino for viola and string orchestra, Op. 11 (1970, 2004)
 Victor Ewald (1860–1935)
     Romance in D major for cello or viola and piano, Op. 2 (1894)
 Eric Ewazen (b. 1954)
     Two Look at Two for high voice, viola and piano (1988)
     Scenarios from a Mixed Landscape for high voice, viola and harp (1993)
     Sonata for viola and piano (1991)
 Ernest van der Eyken (1913–2010)
     Ballata for viola and piano (1981); CeBeDeM
     Sonata for viola solo (1996); CeBeDeM
     Twee melodieën (2 Melodies) for viola and piano (1942); Editions Metropolis; CeBeDeM

References

External links
 Free scores featuring the viola at the International Music Score Library Project

 
Viola C-E